Lepistemon is a genus of flowering plants belonging to the family Convolvulaceae.

Its native range is Tropical Africa, Tropical and Subtropical Asia to Northeastern Australia.

Species:

Lepistemon binectarifer 
Lepistemon intermedius 
Lepistemon leiocalyx 
Lepistemon owariensis 
Lepistemon parviflorus 
Lepistemon urceolatus 
Lepistemon verdcourtii

References

Convolvulaceae
Convolvulaceae genera